The Anderson Street Conservation Park is a protected conservation park in Manunda, Cairns, Queensland, Australia. It is managed by the Cairns Regional Council.

History 
The Anderson Street park was gazetted as an environmental park in 1976. In 1994 it became a conservation park under the Nature Conservation Act 1992.

Protected biota 
The park contains an area of endangered Melaleuca leucadendra open forest and a population of vulnerable spectacled flying-fox (Pteropus conspicillatus).

See also

 Protected areas of Queensland

References

External links
Queensland EPA Anderson Street Conservation Park Management Plan (pdf)

Conservation parks of Queensland